Jordan Township is the name of two townships in the U.S. state of Indiana:

 Jordan Township, Jasper County, Indiana
 Jordan Township, Warren County, Indiana

Indiana township disambiguation pages